Astragalosides are a series of related chemical compounds isolated from Astragalus membranaceus.

References 

Triterpene glycosides
Saponins